Szczecno  is a village in the administrative district of Gmina Daleszyce, within Kielce County, Świętokrzyskie Voivodeship, in south-central Poland.

The village has a population of 740.

References

Szczecno